Rifle Creek Dam is owned by Mount Isa Mines. A concrete arch dam, it was constructed in 1929 to replace the earlier Experimental Dam (the first arch dam in Queensland, completed in September 1925) as the primary water supply to the town of Mt Isa, and the mine. The initial full supply volume was 600 million gallons (2,727 megalitres), the spillway was raised in 1953, and the current full capacity is 9,500 megalitres. The dam was replaced as Mt Isa's primary water supply by Lake Moondarra following the completion of that dam in 1958. Rifle Creek Dam now serves as a backup water supply for Mt Isa Mines.

See also

List of dams and reservoirs in Australia

References

Reservoirs in Queensland
North West Queensland
Dams in Queensland